Peto is a surname. Notable people with the name include: 

András Pető (1893–1967), Hungarian practitioner of physical rehabilitation, inspired conductive education 
Basil Peto (1862–1945), English politician
Christopher Peto (1897–1980),  English politician
Dorothy Peto (1886–1974) British women's police pioneer
Geoffrey Peto (1878–1956), English politician
Gladys Emma Peto (1890–1977), English artist, fashion designer, illustrator and writer of children's books
Harold Peto (1854–1933), English architect and garden designer
Henry Peto (1780–1830), English building contractor 
John F. Peto (1854–1907), American painter
John Peto (cricketer) (died 1874), English cricketer
John Peto (politician) (1900–1954), British Conservative Party politician
Judit Pető (born 1921), birth name of Hungarian designer Judith Leiber
Julian Peto, English statistician and cancer epidemiologist
László Pető (born 1948), Hungarian fencer
László Pető (sport shooter) (born 1969), Hungarian sports shooter
Len Peto (1892–1985), ice hockey executive
Michael Peto, also known as Mihály Petö (1908–1970), Hungarian-British photojournalist
Morton Peto (1809–1889), English entrepreneur, civil engineer and railway developer
Richard Peto (born 1943), English professor of medical statistics and Epidemiology in the University of Oxford
Rosemary Peto (1916–1998), English artist
Samuel Petto (c.1624-1711), English Puritan clergyman
Samuel Morton Peto (1809–1889), English construction entrepreneur
Tibor Peto (born 1980), Hungarian rower
Tim Peto (born 1950), English professor of medicine of the University of Oxford
William Peto, English cricketer
Zoltán Pető (born 1974), Hungarian footballer